The Tuzla oil field is an oil field located in Tuzla, Tuzla Canton. It was discovered in 2004 and developed by Energopetrol.

References

Tuzla
Oil fields in Bosnia and Herzegovina